Jean Bart may refer to one of the following ships of the French Navy or privateers named in honour of Jean Bart (21 October 1651 – 27 April 1702), a French naval commander and privateer.

Naval vessels
 : a 74-gun ship of the line (1791–1809)
 Gunboat Jean Bart, which Admiral Hood took into British service in September–October 1793 at Toulon, and put under the command of Lieutenant Cox. The British may have burnt her when they withdrew from the city.
 : a British lugger of eight guns and 50 tons (bm) that the French captured in August 1793; briefly renamed Joyeaux (1795–96), she was decommissioned in 1800 at Cherbourg.
 : Launched at Bayonne in 1786 as a privateer, she was a 24-gun corvette of the French Navy from 1794 that the Royal Navy captured in 1795 and sold in 1797 at Jamaica.
 : possibly requisitioned in 1803, she was armed in November and was decommissioned on 31 March 1807.
 troop ship n°799 (1803–1806)
 troop ship n°816 (1803–1806)
 , a 74-gun ship of the line (1820–1833)
 , an 80-gun ship of the line
 The ship of the line  was renamed Jean Bart in September 1868
 , a first class cruiser of 4,800 tonnes
 , a 23,600 tonne battleship; the first French dreadnought
 , the last French battleship completed, 40,000 tonnes and armed with 380mm/45 Modèle 1935 guns
  (1988), an anti-aircraft frigate, in service with the French Navy from 1991 to 2021

Privateers
 French 20-gun privateer Jean Bart, constructed at Le Havre in 1778 and launched in January 1779. That year she cruised under the command of François Cottin. In April 1779 he and the owners of Jean Bart submitted a claim for salvage for the Swedish vessel Mercure, which an English privateer had captured on her way from Saint Petersburg to Brest, and which Jean Bart had recaptured 48 hours later. Cottin and Jean Bart captured numerous prizes, including an English vessel of 200 tons (burthen) and 10 guns, after an engagement of an hour and a half.  captured her on 1 April off Dunmore after a fight of about three hours that left Delight with one man killed and two wounded. At the time of her capture Jean Bart had about 190 men on board.  came up after and took Jean Bart into Plymouth.
 French privateer Jean Bart:  captured the privateers Jean Bart and Jeune-Marie of Dunkirk on 21 February 1793. Jean Bart was armed with six 3-pounder and four swivel guns, and had a crew of 39 men. Ferret brought both privateers into Ramsgate.
 French privateer Jean Bart captured on 9 March 1793 by the fireship .
 Jean Bart was a corvette of 500 tons (French; "of load", 20 guns, and about 180 men. She was commissioned in August 1794 and renamed Entreprise circa 1795. Enterprise, under Captain François Legars, captured a number of British vessels in 1795–96, including the British East India Company's pilot boat .
 French privateer lugger Jean Bart, captured on 29 September 1797 by His Majesty's hired armed cutter . Jean Bart was built at Dunkirk in 1780. Before Telemachus captured her, she captured Fly, which was sold for 185,806 livres.
 French privateer Jean Bart of 100 tons, three guns (one a 16-pounder) and four swivel guns, and a crew of 121 men. She made her first, and most profitable cruise, in May 1809. This cruise lasted for six months. Subsequent cruises were shorter, and none was as profitable. In all, she made four cruises during which she took a number of ships and earned for her shareholders a net profit of 366,408 francs. There is no record of what happened to her after the summer of 1811.
 French privateer lugger Jean Bart. On the morning of 1 September 1809, HMS Nassau was escorting a convoy of East Indiamen in the English Channel when she sighted a strange sail. Nassau sent her boats in chase and after two hours they were able to capture Jean Bart of Saint Malo. She was armed with four guns and had a crew of 25 men under the command of Louis Ollivier Pilvesse, Enseign de Vaisseau. She was five days out of the Île de Batz and had made no captures.
 The French privateer Jean Bart captured Valetti, Edward Motley, master, as Valetti was sailing from Malta to Bristol. In the four-hour action Motley and four of his men were wounded; Jean Bart had two men killed and seven wounded.
After a chase of six hours, Semiramis caught up with the privateer, which was under the command of M. Benjamin Dupont. She was of 220 tons burthen, was armed with 14 guns and had a crew of 106 men. She was on her second cruise and had out-sailed several British frigates before; this had induced an over-confidence in M. Dupont, who had permitted Semiramis to approach too near before trying to escape.

Other vessels
 Ketch Jean Bart captured on 1 March 1800 by the hired armed cutter Suwarrow.
 French whaling vessel Jean Bart which visited the Auckland Islands, departing out of Dunkirk in 1838 and anchoring at the Chatham Islands in February 1839.  On February 16, the day of arrival, Captain Gautraux committed suicide; subsequently his ship was burnt and the entire crew either drowned or was massacred by the local Māori people.  Later that same year three other ships, the American whaler Rebecca Sims along with the French whaler Adèle and French naval corvette , returned to exact revenge.
  is the name given to the replica of a 1670, 84-gun ship-of-the-line, that is being constructed by the Association Tourville at Gravelines, Dunkirk, to the plans of the seventeenth century ship builder Colbert. It has European funding through the Heroes2c programme.

Notes, citations and references

Notes

Citations

References
 Borély, A.E. (1881) Histoire de la ville du Havre et de son ancien gouvernement. Vol. 3. (Lepelletier).
 
 Crowhurst, Patrick (1989) The French War on Trade: Privateering 1793–1815. (Scholar Press). 
 Demerliac, Alain (1996) La Marine De Louis XVI: Nomenclature Des Navires Français De 1774 À 1792. (Nice: Éditions OMEGA). 
 
 
 Lebeau, Sylvain (Year 8) Nouveau code des prises, ou Recueil des édits, déclarations, lettres patentes, arrêts, ordonnances, réglemens & décisions sur la course & l'administration des prises, depuis 1400 jusqu'au mois de mai 1789 (v.st.); suivi de toutes les lois, arrêtés, messages, et autres actes qui ont paru depuis cette dernière époque jusqu'à présent. Volume 2.
 Powell, John Williams Darmer (1930) Bristol privateers and ships of war. (Bristol: J.W. Arrowsmith).
 Roche, Jean-Michel (2005) Dictionnaire des Bâtiments de la Flotte de Guerre Française de Colbert à nos Jours. (Group Retozel-Maury Millau), Vol. 1 & 2.
 Société havraise d'études diverses (1884) Recueil des publications.
 

French Navy ship names
Privateer ships of France